The poetry prize Premio Eusebio Lorenzo Baleirón was created in 1988 by the city of Dodro, Spain, with the objective of contributing to the reaffirmation of Galician poetry and to honor the poet Eusebio Lorenzo Baleirón. The winning poems have been published, since 1992, are published in a book titled Colección de poesía Eusebio Lorenzo Baleirón, which is released by Edicións do Castro.

Winners 
2014: Ramón Neto, Zonas de Tránsito.
2013: Cristina Ferreiro Real, As paisaxes eléctricas.
2012: Serxio Iglesias, Viaxe ao interior da fenda.
2011: Isaac Xubín, Con gume de folla húmida
2010: Luís Valle Regueiro, Fedor
2009: Xosé Daniel Costas Currás, Conservas
2008: Xabier Xil Xardón, Cando menos, a derrota
2007: Nieves Soutelo, Código poético
2006: Rafa Villar, Escoración dos días
2005: Mariña Pérez Rei, Fanerógama
2004: Lupe Gómez, Azul estranxeira
2003: María Comesaña Besteiros, Zoonose 
2002: Eduardo Estévez, Caderno apócrifo da pequena defunta
2001: Xosé Lois Rúa, O tránsito da auga 
2000: Carlos Penela, Acaso o inverno
1999: Emma Pedreira, Grimorio
1998: Estevo Creus, Teoría do lugar
1997: Emma Couceiro, As entrañas horas
1996: Isidro Novo, Dende unha nada núa
1995: Xosé Miranda, Amantes e viaxeiros
1994: Xosé M. Millán Picouto, As palabras no espello
1993: Xabier Cordal, Fruto do teixo
1992: Palmira González Boullosa, Asoladamente, o teu nome
1991: Helena Villar Janeiro, Nas hedras da clepsidra
1990: Xavier Rodríguez Barrio, Alborada no muro
1989: Gonzalo Navaza, Fábrica íntima
1988: Xosé López Gómez, O matiz esmeralda na sombra

References

External links 
 News article about the prize

Spanish literary awards